Mirarissoina is a genus of minute sea snails, marine gastropod mollusks or micromollusks in the family Zebinidae.

Species
Species within the genus Mirarissoina include:
 Mirarissoina bermudezi (Aguayo & Rehder, 1936)
 Mirarissoina histia (Bartsch, 1915)
 † Mirarissoina juncea (J. Gardner, 1947) 
 Mirarissoina lata Faber & Moolenbeek, 2013
 †  Mirarissoina lepida (Woodring, 1928)  
 Mirarissoina trauseli Faber & Slieker, 2014
 † Mirarissoina xesta (Woodring, 1928)

References

External links
 Woodring W.P.B. (1928). Miocene mollusks from Bowden, Jamaica. 2. Gastropods and discussion of results. Carnegie Institution of Washington Publication. 385: vii + 564 pp., 40 pls

Zebinidae
Gastropod genera